Jose Febrillet (born March 23, 1980) is an American IFBB professional classic physique bodybuilder. He has won multiple 1st place titles at every major NPC classic physique show since 2015.

Competitive History 
 2016 NPC Universe Championships, Men's Classic Physique Masters Over 35, 1st
 2016 NPC Universe Championships, Men's Classic Physique Class B, 6th
 2016 NPC Atlantic States Championships, Men's Classic Physique Class B 1st
 2016 NPC Atlantic States Championships, Men's Classic Physique Masters Over 35, 1st
 2015 NPC Brooklyn Grand Prix, Men's Physique Novice Class A, 4th
 2015 NPC Brooklyn Grand Prix, Men's Physique Masters, 1st
 2015 NPC Brooklyn Grand Prix, Men's Physique Class B, 1st

References

1980 births
Living people
American bodybuilders
African-American bodybuilders
21st-century African-American sportspeople
20th-century African-American people